Johannes Enschedé IV (20 November 1811 in Haarlem –16 August 1878 in Haarlem) was a Haarlem newspaper editor and printer.

Biography
He was the great-great-grandson of the founder of the Joh. Enschedé company, and the son of Johannes Enschedé III. He studied law in Leiden and returned to become partner in the family company. On 29 November 1849 in Paris he married Mathilda Amelie Lambert, (Mortefontaine, 11 June  1827 – Haarlem, 2 October 1855) the daughter of John Lambert and Charlotte Robertine Mirandolle. From this marriage was born on 26 August 1851 a son: Johannes Enschedé V.  Remarried in Amsterdam on 11 November 1858 with Henriette Jacqueline Mirandolle (The Hague, 31 August 1826 –Haarlem, 12 September 1900) daughter of Mr. Charles François Mirandolle and Georgine Antoinette van der Tuuk.

References

 Het huis Enschedé 1703–1953, Joh. Enschedé en Zonen, Haarlem 1953
 Enschede aan het Klokhuisplein, (Dutch), by Just Enschede, De Vrieseborch, Haarlem, 1991, 
 Catalogue de la bibliothèque (manuscrits, ouvrages xylographiques, incunables, ouvrages d'estampes, livres curieux et rares) formée pendant le 18e siècle par Messieurs Izaak, Iohannes et le Dr. Iohannes Enschedé, sale catalog for the auction of Enschedé III's collection by Frederik Muller and Martinus Nijhoff, 9 December 1867; version on Google books

Members of Teylers Tweede Genootschap
1811 births
1878 deaths
People from Haarlem
Dutch businesspeople
Dutch art collectors
Bibliophiles
Dutch printers
Dutch newspaper editors
Members of the Koninklijke Hollandsche Maatschappij der Wetenschappen